Paul Siegvolk  (real name Albert Mathews) (September 8, 1820 – September 9, 1903) was an American author, lawyer and editor.  He was also the step-father of Alice Claypoole Vanderbilt.

Life
Mathews was born in New York City on September 8, 1820.  He was the son of Oliver Mathews (1794–1881) and Mary (née Field) Mathews (1796–1866).  His father's family in the United States originated with Annanias Mathews, his great-grandfather, who came from England in the 17th century. His mother's side was descended from Robert Field, a Quaker who also came from England and settled in Flushing, which was then considered Long Island, in 1645.

He graduated from Yale in 1842, where he was co-editor and contributor to the Yale Literary Magazine.  He studied law at Harvard in 1832 and 1843.

Career
Mathews was admitted to the New York Bar in 1845 and practiced law in New York City for forty five years.

He was a contributor to The Knickerbocker from 1852-8.  He also wrote for the New York Mirror, Home Journal and Evening Post.

His Walter Ashwood: A Love Story was published in New York in 1859 (duodecimo).

Personal life
In 1848, he first married Louisa Mott Strong (1826–1858).  Following her death, he married Rachel Moore Flagg (1822–1884), the daughter of Henry Collins Flagg, the long time mayor of New Haven, Connecticut, and Martha Whiting Flagg, in 1861.  Rachel, the widow of Abraham Evan Gwynne, was the mother of Alice Claypoole Gwynne, who married Cornelius Vanderbilt II in 1867.  Mathews lived at The Chelsea located at 222 West 23rd Street in New York City and his office was located at 31 Pine Street, also in New York.

Mathews died on September 9, 1903 at Lake Mohonk in New York. He was a member of the Bar Association, University Club, Century Club, Yale Club and Authors Clubs as well as the National Sculptors' Society, National Arts Society, and American Arts Society. On February 27, 1882, he was elected a member of the Saint Nicholas Society of the City of New York.

Published works

 Lines to A.M. The Knickerbocker, March 1852, pp. 263–264
 Schediasms The Knickerbocker, January 1852, pp. 42–45
 Schediasms including The Rights of Children The Knickerbocker, Issue 39, June 1852, pp. 487–490
 Schediasms: The Blithedale Romance The Knickerbocker, November 1852, pp. 381–384
 Sebediasms The Knickerbocker, March 1853, pp. 197–202
 Schediasms The Knickerbocker, May 1854, pp. 503–504
 Schediasms The Knickerbocker, March 1856, pp. 275–278
 Schediasms The Knickerbocker, June 1856, pp. 609–611
 Schediasms The Knickerbocker, July 1856, pp. 68–70
 Schediasms The Knickerbocker, August 1856, pp. 172–174
 Schediasms The Knickerbocker, October 1856, pp. 345–350
 Schediasms The Knickerbocker, November 1856, pp. 495–497
 Schediasms The Knickerbocker, January 1857, pp. 13–17
 Schediasms The Knickerbocker, May 1857, pp. 435–437
 Walter Ashwood: A Love Story (1860)

References

External links

1820 births
1903 deaths
Knickerbocker Group
American lawyers
American editors
American male writers